Unter den Linden ("Under the Linden Trees") op. 30 is a waltz by Johann Strauss III first performed by the composer on June 2, 1900.

Johann III undertook a five-month Concert tour of Germany and the Netherlands in 1900. Johann III wrote to his friend on 23 March 1900:

This work was premiered in Neues Königliches Opernhaus Berlin on June 2, 1900. This waltz is a representative work of Johann III.  It has been occasionally programmed since, including a 2015 performance and CD.

Bibliography 
 CD„ Vienna Premiere, Vol. 3“ – Unter den Linden. walzer (Under the Linden Trees. Waltz) Op. 30
 Berlin Development Designed to Hold Its Own With History – by Richard Holledgedec. December. 3, 2015

References 

Waltzes
1900 compositions